eBART (East Contra Costa County BART extension) is a hybrid rail (light rail with some features similar to commuter rail) branch line of the Bay Area Rapid Transit (BART) system in eastern Contra Costa County, California, United States. Service starts at Pittsburg/Bay Point station and extends to Antioch station.

eBART tracks and trains are incompatible with those of the main BART rapid transit system, making it impossible for trains to move between the two systems. Instead, passengers make a cross-platform transfer at an auxiliary stop at Pittsburg/Bay Pointthe platform is accessible only by riding a train from the main station to the auxiliary stop. The American Public Transportation Association classifies the service as commuter rail.

History

Planning 
For further extension into Contra Costa County and to extend the Pittsburg/Bay Point–SFO/Millbrae line, the DMU system was chosen as an alternative to the existing BART infrastructure because it was claimed to be both less expensive to implement and would more easily allow further extensions.

Initial plans had trains running on the Union Pacific Railroad right-of-way that runs parallel to State Route 4. After Union Pacific declined to grant trackage rights or allow laying of new tracks, the line was merged with a construction project already in the process of widening the adjacent freeway, by laying tracks in its median. Construction of the Railroad Avenue station in Pittsburg had been uncertain as planning and construction progressed but was fully funded by the city to open with the rest of the extension.

Ridership was initially projected at 5600 entrances and exits per weekday (supposing an opening date of 2015).

Funding and construction 

A sales tax increase was approved by Contra Costa voters in 2004 in order to fund the expansion. The expansion was approved by the BART board in April 2009. Costs were set at $463 million (equivalent to $ in ), compared to an estimated $1.2 billion (equivalent to $ in ) for full BART buildout. On October 14, 2010, BART issued a press release announcing that the agency had awarded a $26 million (equivalent to $ in ) contract to West Bay Builders, of Novato, "to build the transfer platform and make some of the necessary rail improvements to begin extending the line to a terminus station at Hillcrest Avenue in Antioch."

Construction on the line began in early 2011. Funding for the Pittsburg station was secured in early 2015, and the station opened with the commencement of operations.

Start of service 
Revenue service began on May 26, 2018. The new stations reached 7,441 daily customer entrances and exits within the first three workdays, while ridership and parking levels at the previous terminal, Pittsburg/Bay Point, declined. Its design and operation, the result of several compromises, were criticized by Streetsblog.

Future 
While not fully planned or funded , expansions of the DMU system could connect eBART service to Oakley, Byron, or the Brentwood Transit Center in Brentwood. In 2017, the San Joaquin Regional Rail Commission indicated that eBART could be extended to Tracy, where it would connect with the Altamont Corridor Express and a proposed Valley link line.

Stations 

All eBART stations are in Contra Costa County.

Rolling stock 

Trains servicing the line include eight Stadler GTW coupled pairs. The first were delivered in June 2016, and the agency has two options to procure six more sets. The Stadler GTW trains are diesel multiple units with 2/6 articulated power units, and are based on models previously used in Austin (Capital MetroRail), Denton (A-train), and New Jersey (River Line).

See also 

 Light rail in the United States

References

External links 

 

Bay Area Rapid Transit
Antioch, California
Bay Point, California
Brentwood, California
California railroads
Light rail in California
Pittsburg, California
Public transportation in the San Francisco Bay Area
Railway lines in highway medians
Railway lines opened in 2018
Standard gauge railways in the United States
Transportation in Contra Costa County, California
Railway branch lines
2018 establishments in California